The Department of Scientific and Industrial Research (DSIR) is a now-defunct government science agency in New Zealand, founded in 1926 and broken into Crown Research Institutes in 1992.

Foundation
DSIR was founded in 1926 by Ernest Marsden after calls from Ernest Rutherford for government to support education and research and on the back of the Imperial Economic Conference in London in October and November 1923, when various colonies discussed setting up such departments. It initially received funding from sources such as the Empire Marketing Board. The initial plans also included a new agricultural college, to be jointly founded by Auckland and Victoria University Colleges, Palmerston North was chosen as the site for this and it grew to become Massey University.

Structure 
DSIR initially had five divisions:
 Grasslands in Palmerston North
 Plant Diseases in Auckland
 Entomology, attached to the Cawthron Institute in Nelson
 Soil Survey (later Soil Bureau) in Taita
 Agronomy (later Crop Research Division) in Lincoln
 Geophysics Division from 1951

The later Antarctic Division became Antarctica New Zealand in 1996.

List of directors-general
The following is a list of Directors-General (Chief Executive) of DSIR:
 Ernest Marsden - 1926 to 1947
 Frank Callaghan - 1947 to 1953
 Bill Hamilton - 1953 to 1971
 Eddie Robertson - 1971 to 1980
 Bruce Miller - 1980 to 1984
 Jim Ellis - 1984 to 1989
 Mike Collins - 1989 to 1994

Dissolution
Reconstituted into initially 10 semi-independent entities called Crown Research Institutes by the Crown Research Institutes Act 1992, with some further consolidation since.

See also

Further reading

References

External links
 Department of Scientific and Industrial Research entry in the 1966 edition of the Encyclopaedia of New Zealand

1926 establishments in New Zealand
1992 disestablishments in New Zealand
Scientific organisations based in New Zealand
Former government agencies of New Zealand